Eric Hamilton may refer to:

 Eric Hamilton (bishop) (1890–1962), English bishop
 Eric Hamilton (cricketer) (1913–1943), South African cricketer
 Eric Hamilton (American football) (born 1953), American football coach